Raja Mukthi is a 1948 Indian Tamil language film starring M. K. Thyagaraja Bhagavathar, V. N. Janaki and P. Bhanumathi. M. G. Ramachandran had done a supporting role. The film was released on 9 October 1948.

Plot 
King Rajendra Varman and Queen Mrinalini are reigning over the Vyjayanti empire. Mahendra Varman is the rival and the neighbouring King. Kannika is the minister's daughter, who is in love with King Rajendra Varman and aims to attain him at any cost.

This convoluted tale of palace intrigue, suspicion, unreciprocated love, seduction, villainy and piety was interspersed with excellent music.

Cast

Production 
M. K. Thyagaraja Bhagavathar produced this movie himself under his banner Narendra Pictures. He had done so in order to avoid shooting the movie in Madras city, where he had been imprisoned for more than 2 years. He booked Prabhat Studios in Poona and leased a bungalow to accommodate his cast. Most of the technicians are from Prabhat Studios.

Soundtrack 
Alathur Subramaniam, one the two Alathur Brothers 'trained' the singers while the background music was composed by C. R. Subburaman. Lyrics by Papanasam Sivan. M. K. Thyagaraja Bhagavathar, P. Bhanumathi, Serukalathur Sama and C. T. Rajakantham are the singers. Playback singer is M. L. Vasanthakumari.

Trivia 
The famous T. N. Rajarathinam Pillai played the nadaswaram for a sequence.
The music records of Raja Mukthi  witnessed record sales even before the movie’s release.
C. R. Subburaman had introduced a new female singer M. L. Vasanthakumari to Tamil cinema through Raja Mukthi in a debut as a playback singer.
Raja Mukthi had an average run. This film was lengthy and it had no comedy scenes. The producer didn't face any loss from this film though the expectation was very high.

References

External links 
 

1948 films
1940s Tamil-language films
Indian black-and-white films
Films scored by C. R. Subbaraman